Pelagibacterium halotolerans is a Gram-negative, aerobic and motile bacterium from the genus of Pelagibacterium which has been isolated from sea water from the East China Sea in China.

References

Further reading

External links
Type strain of Pelagibacterium halotolerans at BacDive -  the Bacterial Diversity Metadatabase

Hyphomicrobiales
Bacteria described in 2011